A zero-turn riding lawn mower (colloquially, a z-turn) is a standard riding lawn mower with a turning radius that is effectively zero when the two drive wheels rotate in opposite direction, like a tank turning in place.

Different brands and models achieve this in different ways, with hydraulic speed control of each drive wheel being the most common method when a gasoline or diesel engine is used. Battery-powered models simply use two electric motors. Both commercial duty and homeowner models exist, with varying engine power options, size of cutting decks, and prices. A z-turn mower typically drives faster and costs more than a similarly sized conventional riding mower that has steerable front wheels.

Most current models have four wheels: two small swiveling front tires and two large drive tires in the back. Bush Hog (Inc. of Selma, Alabama) mowers sometimes come with a small, pivoting fifth wheel mounted in the center behind the driver. Instead of controlling the swiveling tires to steer the machine, the large drive tires rotate independently of each other based on the driver's input. They may rotate in opposite directions. The mower can pivot around a point midway between the drive wheels (the classic z-turn), or it can pivot around either one of the drive wheels if one is stationary, or it can turn in a circle of any radius. Reversal of the direction of travel can be accomplished by causing both wheels to rotate in reverse.

History
 In 1949, Warrensburg, MO resident Max B. Swisher invented the very first commercially available zero-turn mower and called it the "Ride King". It was a three-wheeled machine: one drive wheel in front and two in the rear. The patented system had a driven front wheel that was capable of turning 360 degrees. The wheel was driven by the motor in the same direction at all times. In order to reverse or utilize the zero-turn capabilities, the driver simply turned the steering wheel 180 degrees and the mower would move backwards.

 In 1963 another system was designed: Hesston Corporation was a manufacturer of farm and agricultural equipment and had recently engineered a device called the swather, which, propelled by a series of belts, cut hay, alfalfa and other farming materials and laid them out in windrows. One of their employees, John Regier, was struck by the swather's belt-and-pulley mechanism, that allowed for counter-rotation. His idea was: what if the same technology could be incorporated into lawnmowers?

 "So he went home and invented this thing that was able to operate on the zero-turn radius," says Ken Raney, advertising manager at the time for Hustler Turf. "He began selling them, but they weren't really taking off the way he wanted them to." Regier's design was the first twin-lever zero-turn lawn mower. There was no steering wheel. The lawn mower turned on a zero degree radius by utilizing two independent drive levers. This technology was new and regarded as unusual, which resulted in the slow acceptance. Regier's patent was eventually sold to Excel Industries, the parent company of Hustler Turf and BigDog Mower Co. The mower was called – appropriately enough – the Hustler.

 "We were the first company to offer mowers with zero-turn technology," says Paul Mullet, president of Excel Industries. "After Regier sold us the patent, he came to work for us and the rest is history." Excel Industries is the parent company of Hustler Turf Equipment, Inc., which manufacturers Hustler Turf and BigDog Mowers zero-turn mowers.

 In 1974, the Dixon company coined the term "zero-turn radius" on their entrance into the mower market.

 In 1997, Robert D. Davis Jr. obtained United States Patent 5644903 for a new steering control he had invented for a zero turn radius mower, based on eight previous patents.

 Currently, there are more than three dozen zero-turn mower manufacturers, offering a range of mid-mounted and out-front mowing deck options and accessories.

Steering
For most zero-turn mowers today, steering is simply changing the speeds of the drive tires, a method called differential steering. The tire speed is controlled by two levers that protrude on either side of the driver and typically extend over the lap (aka. lap bars). It is not that different from steering a shopping cart. When both levers are pushed forward simultaneously with the same force, the mower moves forward; when both levers are pulled back simultaneously with the same force, the mower moves backward. Push one lever more than the other and the mower makes a gentle turn. Push one lever forward and pull the other back and the mower pivots from the drive wheels, creating a zero-radius turn.

Zero-turn mowers can use steering wheels but must be designed much differently.
 Cub Cadet is one of the few zero-turns to use a steering wheel by connecting the back wheels to an axle. The axle is mounted in its midpoint to the body of the mower.

Operation
Zero-turn mowers are designed to cut so closely around obstacles that there's virtually no need to trim. These mowers pivot through 180 degrees without leaving any uncut grass. Maximum lever movement means maximum fluid flow, which translates into a rapidly turning wheel. If one drive wheel turns more rapidly than the other, the machine moves along a curved path. If both wheels turn at the same speed, the machine follows a straight path. If one wheel stops and the other turns, or if the wheels turn in opposite directions, the mower pivots.

This drive system can be used on two different types of zero turn mowers:
 Mid Mount, where the mower is suspended under a 4-wheel chassis.
 The mid-mount has front caster wheels and rear drive wheels.
 Out Front, where the mower is front mounted and thus terrain following. The terrain following models provide a higher level of balance, comfort, safety and performance. 
 The Out-front models use a centralised main drive wheel system with front and rear caster wheels.

As both types use traction only as a steering system, care must be taken on any sloping terrain. Loss of traction causes total loss of steering.

References

Lawn mowers